Paschim Barigog Anchalik Mahavidyalaya, established in 1984, is a general degree college situated at Paschim Barigog, in Kamrup district, Assam. This college is affiliated with the Gauhati University. This college offers different bachelor's degree courses in arts.

References

External links
http://pbam.co.in/index.php

Universities and colleges in Assam
Colleges affiliated to Gauhati University
Educational institutions established in 1984
1984 establishments in Assam